

Players

Competitions

Division Four

League table

Results summary

League position by match

Matches

FA Cup

Rumbelows Cup

Leyland DAF Cup

Appearances and goals

References

Books

1990-91
Northampton Town
Northampton Town